Palace Guttahalli is one of the oldest districts of Bangalore, Karnataka, India.

Palace Guttahalli, located in the north-west of Bangalore, and derives its name from the famous Bangalore Palace as it is situated right next to it.
The area houses lot of popular printing presses, cyber centers and tailoring shops, Also situated there is Jamia Masjid which is the big mosque in the locality and also has many temples like Dattatreya temple, Raghavendra mutt, Uttarayana temple, Muneshwara temple etc. are situated here. Vasavi Diagnosis, first state government initiative is situated in this area. National Tuberculosis Institute is situated on Bellary road, Guttahalli, next to Cauvery Theatre.
Vinayaka circle and Guttahalli circle are major junctions here. The area is surrounded by other popular areas such as Malleshwaram, Seshadripuram, Kumarapark, Vyalikaval, Lower Palace Orchards, Sadashivnagar. Popular Sankey Tank lake is situated very near to the area.

Transport 
Palace Guttahalli is well connected by the Bangalore Metropolitan Transportation Corporation buses (BMTC) with the downtown and other localities in Bangalore. Nagappa Street and 2nd Main road are the two main roads running through the heart of Palace Guttahalli. The vehicular density and the resulting pollution on these roads is a major cause of concern. BMTC buses like 176 series, 104 series commute regularly.

Demographics 

Neighbourhoods in Bangalore